Joel Greenshields (born April 14, 1988) is a Canadian competition swimmer. Born in Edson, Alberta, he competes in the 100-metre freestyle.

At the 2008 Summer Olympics in Beijing, he was a member of the Canadian team that finished sixth in the 4x100-metre freestyle relay event.  The team had previously finished in seventh at the 2007 World Aquatics Championships.

See also
 World record progression 4 × 200 metres freestyle relay

References

1988 births
Living people
Arizona Wildcats men's swimmers
Canadian male freestyle swimmers
World record setters in swimming
Olympic swimmers of Canada
People from Edson, Alberta
Sportspeople from Alberta
Swimmers at the 2008 Summer Olympics